Ysgafell Wen Far North Top is a top of Ysgafell Wen North Top in Snowdonia, North Wales. It lies directly to the west of Ysgafell Wen North Top, and rises as a rocky outcrop from one of the dog lakes, Llynnau'r Cwn.

References

External links
 www.geograph.co.uk : photos of Ysgafell Wen and surrounding area

Beddgelert
Dolwyddelan
Mountains and hills of Conwy County Borough
Mountains and hills of Gwynedd
Mountains and hills of Snowdonia
Nuttalls

cy:Ysgafell Wen